"Toss It Up" is a song by rapper Tupac Shakur from his fifth studio album, The Don Killuminati: The 7 Day Theory (1996). Released under the stage name Makaveli, the song served as the lead single to the posthumous album. It was first released in the United States just under two weeks after his death, peaking at number thirty-three on the R&B singles chart. The song is known for including a diss toward Dr. Dre and instrumentally being very similar to the production on the song "No Diggity". It features vocals and singing from Aaron Hall, Danny Boy, and K-Ci & JoJo. The single release altered slightly to the version found on the album. The album version was later included on Shakur's 1998 compilation Greatest Hits with a new mix and alternative lyrics.

Controversy
The finished production shared close similarities to Blackstreet's "No Diggity". Due to that, Jimmy Iovine sent a cease and desist order which forced them to reproduce the song. A new verse, dissing Dr. Dre, was also recorded for the new version. On the outro of the song, 2Pac also disses Puff Daddy and Lil Kim, responding to what Puff Daddy said about him in an interview.

Music video
Two videos were recorded for the song. One, the main version, is set in a garage and features 2Pac wearing safety goggles and using a blow torch and baseball bat. was shot on the evening of September 6, 1996 . The videos were shot alongside featured artists Danny Boy, K-Ci and JoJo. Aaron Hall does not appear in the video. Both videos were directed by Lionel C. Martin.

Versions
Album version: The only version to feature the "album vibe" introduction. 
Single version: With "needle drop" introduction by 2Pac, entirely different mix, and less, "Boom!", backing vocals throughout.
Greatest Hits version: An entirely new mix of the album version, minus the  "album vibe" intro, and features some altered lyrics.
Original early mix produced by Dr. Dre: Officially unreleased, though leaked, this version doesn't include the final, Dre diss verse.
Nu-Mixx version: A remix found on the 2003 compilation album, Nu-Mixx Klazzics.

Charts

Weekly charts

Year-end charts

Certifications

References 

1996 songs
1996 singles
Diss tracks
Interscope Records singles
Music videos directed by Lionel C. Martin
Songs written by Danny Boy (singer)
Songs written by Aaron Hall (singer)
Songs written by Tupac Shakur
Tupac Shakur songs
G-funk songs
Songs written by Teddy Riley
Songs written by K-Ci